Shelley Wetterberg (born 26 August 1971) is a Canadian fencer. She competed in the women's team foil event at the 1992 Summer Olympics.

References

External links
 

1971 births
Living people
Canadian female fencers
Olympic fencers of Canada
Fencers at the 1992 Summer Olympics
Sportspeople from Calgary